James McRae (born 1987) is an Australian former representative rower. James McRae or MacRae may also refer to:

James McRae (United States Army officer) (1862–1940), U.S. general
James W. McRae (1910–1960), American engineer
James Macrae (botanist) (died 1830), Scottish botanist
James C. MacRae (1838–1909), justice of the North Carolina Supreme Court